The Mary Imogene Bassett Hospital (Bassett Medical Center) is a teaching hospital in Cooperstown, New York.  The hospital opened in June 1922. The hospital has 180 beds.  It is associated with Columbia University.  It is home to the Bassett Cancer Institute.

History
Some of the early work on bone marrow transplants was performed here by Nobel prize winner E. Donnall Thomas and his wife Dottie Thomas.   Joseph Wiley Ferrebee was also a transplant scientist working at the hospital.

The Bassett Healthcare Network runs this hospital and six others, including:
A.O. Fox Memorial Hospital in Oneonta and Tri-Town Campus
Bassett Hospital in Schoharie
Cobleskill Regional Hospital in Cobleskill
Little Falls Hospital in Little Falls
O’Connor Hospital in Delhi

Publishing
The hospital has published a number of works including
 Clinical Miscelleny vols 1 & 2, 1930s

External links
 Profile at health.ny.gov
 
 Friends of Bassett

References

Teaching hospitals in New York (state)

Hospitals established in 1922